Corve  may refer to:

 Corf, an underwater container used to hold live fish or crustaceans
 Corf (mining), a basket or small wagon for transporting coal
 River Corve, in Shropshire, England